Fire in the Dark is the third studio album by American country music artist Billy Dean. It was released in 1993 on SBK/Liberty Records and like his previous two albums, it was certified gold by the RIAA. Unlike his first two albums, which were produced by Tom Shapiro, this one was produced by Liberty Records' then-president Jimmy Bowen, with Dean as co-producer. Singles from this album include "Tryin' to Hide a Fire in the Dark", "I Wanna Take Care of You", "I'm Not Built That Way" and a cover of Dave Mason's #12 1977 pop hit "We Just Disagree". Also covered here is James Taylor's "Steamroller Blues." Of these singles, "Tryin' to Hide a Fire in the Dark" and "We Just Disagree" were both Top Ten hits on the country music charts.

Track listing

Personnel
Billy Dean- lead vocals
Dan Dugmore- dobro, steel guitar
Vicki Hampton- background vocals
John Barlow Jarvis- keyboards, synthesizer
Kirk "Jelly Roll" Johnson- harmonica
Chris Leuzinger- electric guitar
Dan Mahar- electric guitar
Donna McElroy- background vocals
John Rich- steel guitar
Cindy Richardson Walker- background vocals
Biff Watson- acoustic guitar, synthesizer
John Willis- electric guitar
Dennis Wilson- background vocals
Lonnie Wilson- bells, cymbals, drums, percussion
Glenn Worf- bass guitar
Curtis Young- background vocals

Chart performance

1993 albums
Billy Dean albums
Liberty Records albums
Albums produced by Jimmy Bowen